Viktor Zaporozhets (Віктор Костянтинович Запорожець, born 23 May 1947) is a Ukrainian boxer. He competed in the men's light flyweight event at the 1968 Summer Olympics for the Soviet Union and finished in ninth place.

References

External links
 

1947 births
Living people
Russian male boxers
Olympic boxers of the Soviet Union
Boxers at the 1968 Summer Olympics
Sportspeople from Sverdlovsk Oblast
Light-flyweight boxers